The buccal nerve (long buccal nerve) is a nerve in the face. It is a branch of the mandibular nerve (which is itself a branch of the trigeminal nerve) and transmits sensory information from skin over the buccal membrane (in general, the cheek) and from the second and third molar teeth.  Not to be confused with the buccal branch of the facial nerve which transmits motor information to the buccinator muscle.

Structure
The buccal nerve courses between the two heads of the lateral pterygoid muscle, underneath the tendon of the temporalis muscle. It then runs under the masseter muscle, anterior to the ramus of the mandible. It connects with the buccal branches of the facial nerve on the surface of the buccinator muscle. It gives off many significant branches.

Relations
The facial nerve (CN VII) also has buccal branches, which carry motor innervation to the buccinator muscle, a muscle of facial expression. This follows from the trigeminal (V3) supplying all muscles of mastication and the facial (VII) supplying all muscles of facial expression.

Function
Small branches of the buccal nerve innervate the lateral pterygoid muscle. It also gives sensory branches to the cheek.

Clinical significance

Anesthesia 
Buccal nerve block (long buccal nerve block) is indicated for procedures involving the mucosa adjacent to the posterior molar teeth, such as the placement of a rubber dam clamp. The injection site is distal and buccal to the third molar, with the needle penetrating 1-2mm as the nerve lies directly below the mucosa. A buccal nerve block is carried out after an inferior alveolar nerve block  for specific procedures, such as extraction of mandibular molar teeth.

Surgical damage 
The buccal nerve may be damaged by surgical incisions near the external oblique ridge of the mandible.

Additional images

References 
 "Nerve, buccal." Stedman's Medical Dictionary, 27th ed. (2000). 
 Gray's Anatomy: The Anatomical Basis of Clinical Practice. (2005). 

Specific

External links
 
 
 
 

Mandibular nerve